is a former Japanese football player.

Playing career
Nakamura was born in Konan on May 20, 1971. After graduating from high school, he joined Toyota Motors in 1990. He debuted in first season and played in several games as mainly side back. In 1992, he moved to new club Shimizu S-Pulse. Although he played some matches in 1994, he could not play many matches. In 1996, he moved to Japan Football League club Ventforet Kofu. He played many matches in 1996 season. However his opportunity to play decreased from 1997 season and he retired end of 1998 season.

Club statistics

References

External links

geocities.co.jp

1971 births
Living people
Association football people from Shiga Prefecture
Japanese footballers
Japan Soccer League players
J1 League players
Japan Football League (1992–1998) players
Nagoya Grampus players
Shimizu S-Pulse players
Ventforet Kofu players
Association football defenders